The Reverend William Robertson Wood (June 6, 1874—December 11, 1947) was a Presbyterian minister and politician in Manitoba, Canada.  He served in the Legislative Assembly of Manitoba from 1915 to 1920, as a member of the Liberal Party.

Wood was born in Veira, Orkney, Scotland, the son of William Wood and Margaret Robertson, and came to Canada in 1887.  He was educated in Scotland and at Port Elgin High School, at Toronto University and at Knox College in Toronto, graduating in 1904.  In the same year, he married Margaret Workman. Ordained as a Presbyterian minister, he served in Dunbarton, Ontario from 1904 to 1908, in Claremont, Ontario from 1908 to 1913, and in Franklin, Manitoba after 1913. He continued to work as a minister after winning election to the legislature. From 1916 to 1917, he was secretary of the Free Trade League of Canada. In 1917, he became secretary of the Manitoba Grain Growers' Association. In 1919 Wood received a D.D. from Bates College.

He first ran for the Manitoba legislature in the 1914 provincial election, losing to Conservative cabinet minister James H. Howden by 32 votes in the Beautiful Plains constituency.  Howden did not seek re-election in the 1915 election, and Wood defeated his Conservative opponent J.H. Irwin by 197 votes.  The Liberals won a landslide majority in this election, and Wood served as a backbench supporter of Tobias Norris's government.

He did not seek re-election in 1920. Wood became secretary of the United Farmers of Manitoba serving until 1925. In that year, he became chairman of the Manitoba Prohibition Alliance.

In 1928, he became principal of the Ahousat Indian School on Vancouver Island and later, of the Indian School at Portage la Prairie. From 1943 to 1946, Wood was chaplain for the Stony Mountain Penitentiary.

He died in Portage la Prairie as the result of injuries sustained in a fall in Poplar Point.

References 

1874 births
Manitoba Liberal Party MLAs
1947 deaths
Canadian Presbyterian ministers